Georgemas Junction railway station is a railway station located in the Highland council area in the far north of Scotland. It serves several rural hamlets in the historic county of Caithness, including Georgemas, Roadside and Banniskirk.

Immediately to the west of the station lies a junction of the same name, where the branch to  spurs off northwards; mileages on this branch are measured from the station. This junction is the northernmost railway junction in the United Kingdom.

The station has a single platform which is long enough to accommodate a six-carriage train. The station is managed by ScotRail, who operate the services at the station.

History

The station was built by the Sutherland and Caithness Railway (S&CR). The station buildings were designed by Murdoch Paterson and it opened on 28 July 1874  and on that date the Highland Railway absorbed the S&CR and operated the newly completed line from Helmsdale to Thurso and Wick. A wrought-iron turntable of  diameter built by the Railway Steel and Plant Company of Manchester was installed at the station.

In 1902, Donald Mackenzie, station master was appointed first station master of Dornoch railway station.

From 1 January 1923 the station was operated by the London Midland and Scottish Railway.

Accidents and incidents 
At the end of February 1937 trains were stranded at Georgemas Junction because of heavy snow. An engine with a snow plough was also stuck at the same location.

Trains to and from Thurso 
Until diesel multiple unit trains were introduced by British Rail in the early 1990s, all trains on the Far North Line were locomotive-hauled, initially by Highland Railway steam locomotives, then by LMSR steam locomotives and latterly by British Railways steam and finally Class 37 diesel locomotives. Northbound passenger trains would divide at Georgemas Junction, with the rear portion for Thurso and the front portion for Wick. A locomotive was stabled at Georgemas Junction to haul the Thurso carriages.

Following the introduction of Class 156 diesel multiple units on the line, trains were always composed of two trainsets (four cars) and at Georgemas, these would split in half with the front portion heading to Wick, the rear to Thurso. This practice was halted with the introduction of Class 158 sets which operate as single sets - on arrival at Georgemas Junction from Inverness, trains reverse to reach Thurso, and then reverse again from Thurso back to Georgemas Junction (stopping a second time) and on to Wick. An easement to the National Routeing Guide allows passengers for Wick to stay on the train between Georgemas Junction and Thurso, which would otherwise technically be off-route.

Georgemas Junction station has been used for several freight services. In the early 2000s, EWS operated a freight train for Safeway supermarket, running from Mossend to Georgemas. Containers were unloaded at Georgemas, then transported by road to Wick and Thurso, and by ferry to Orkney. In 2012, the former platform 1 and the footbridge was removed when Direct Rail Services constructed a new freight terminal at Georgemas - this has been used by trains taking nuclear material from Dounreay to Sellafield. As this platform was located on a passing loop which did not connect directly to the Thurso branch, it was very little-used by passenger trains, since all services through the station run to or from Thurso. The purpose of the passing loop dates back to the era of loco-hauled trains which divided/attached at the station  an Inverness-bound train from Wick would loop around the Thurso portion standing on the second (remaining) platform, and attach to it from behind.

Facilities
Facilities at this station include a payphone that accepts card and coins, a waiting room and designated seating area, a cycle rack with 10 spaces, and a free car park with 2 spaces.

Passenger volume 

The statistics cover twelve month periods that start in April.

Services

On Sundays, the frequency is reduced to one train per day each way, meaning two trains go to Thurso.

References

Bibliography

External links

ScotRail North Highlands Timetable (valid from 6 feb 2023)

Railway stations in Caithness
Rail junctions in Scotland
Railway stations served by ScotRail
Railway stations in Great Britain opened in 1874
Former Highland Railway stations